This is a list of films which have placed number one at the weekly box office in Japan during 1993. Amounts are in Yen and are from a sample of key cities.

References

See also
 Lists of box office number-one films

1993
1993 in Japanese cinema
Japan